The following is a list of Chinese films scheduled for release in 2020. A number of films scheduled for release early in the year were delayed or released online due to the COVID-19 pandemic.

Films

January–March

TBA

References

2020
Films
Chinese